Kjell Bartholdsen (2 October 1938 in Hammerfest – 6 November 2009) was a Norwegian jazz musician (saxophone), that lived in Bodø from 1968.

Career 
Bartholdsen was a piano tuner by profession, and he was also a central person on the northern Norwegian jazz scene. His instruments were tenor saxophone, and clarinet (in his early career). He played at Moldejazz in 1974, Nattjazz in 1975, Kongsberg Jazzfestival in 1976, Vossajazz in 1978 as well as several times in the Festival of North Norway and with Concerts Norway. He had to retire in 1988 after a stroke, and had also suffered from bad eyesight during his career. He died in November 2009.

Honors 
1989: Stubøprisen

Discography

Solo albums 
2008: Arctic Bird (Turn Left Prod)

Collaborative works 
2001: Jazz From North Norway (Gemini Records), Distant Reports with various artists

References

1938 births
2009 deaths
Norwegian jazz saxophonists
Musicians from Hammerfest
Musicians from Bodø
20th-century saxophonists